Malharrao is a mandal in Jayashankar Bhupalpally district of the Telangana state in India.

References 

Mandals in Jayashankar Bhupalpally district